The 2017 Giro della Toscana Int. Femminile – Memorial Michela Fanini will be the 23rd edition of the Giro della Toscana Int. Femminile – Memorial Michela Fanini, a women's cycling stage race in Italy. It was rated by the UCI as a category 2.2 race.

Stages

Classification leadership

See also

2017 in women's road cycling

References

Giro della Toscana Int. Femminile – Memorial Michela Fanini